Hiroshiinoueana is a genus of moths belonging to the subfamily Olethreutinae of the family Tortricidae.

Species
Hiroshiinoueana gangweonensis Cho & Byun, 1993
Hiroshiinoueana stellifera Kawabe, 1978

See also
List of Tortricidae genera

References

External links
tortricidae.com

Tortricidae genera
Gatesclarkeanini